Frank Ortiz may refer to:

Frank S. Ortiz (1909–before 2009), American public official, mayor of Santa Fe, New Mexico, from 1948 to 1952
Frank V. Ortiz Jr. (1926–2005), American diplomat

See also
Francisco Ortiz (disambiguation)